

News

January
1 – Sven Nys wins the Grand Prix Sven Nys in Baal where he resides, winning the competition for the sixth time, this time finishing in front of 2006 winner Lars Boom, while fellow Baal citizen Niels Albert finishes in third position. svennys.com
3 – Richard Groenendaal wins the Centrumcross Surhuisterveen for the third consecutive time. It was his first win of the season. rabobank.nl
7 – Bart Wellens, Lars Boom, Petr Dlask, Enrico Franzoi and Francis Mourey all become national champion after beating their fellow countrymen in the world's top nations. cycling4all.com
14 – Sven Nys celebrates his sixth World Cup victory of the season as he wins the Grand Prix Nommay. velonews.com
14 – Ben Berden returns to the sport after being suspended for two years due to the use of doping with a third place in the Grand Prix Jean Bausch-Pierre Kellner. dewielersite.net
17 – Sven Nys wins the first ever held indoor cyclo-cross race named the Flanders Indoor Cyclo-cross held in Mechelen. He won the race in the final, after finishing only fourth in the first of two heats. svennys.com
19 – Rabobank retreats Boy van Poppel from the World Championships and further cyclo-cross competitions as the Dutchman suffers from heart problems. Van Poppel has to undergo medical examination before he is allowed back in competition. dewielersite.net
26 – Francis Mourey is taken to hospital after falling in a training. Therefore, he will miss the World Championships and is unable to defend his bronze medal from 2006. hln.be
27 – Lars Boom finishes way in front of his first opponent Niels Albert to claim the world title in the under 23s category. Junior World Cup winner Joeri Adams outsprints his opponents in the final metres of the race to win his rainbow jersey. , cyclingnews.com
28 – Erwin Vervecken successfully defends his world title after winning in an exciting race where the top favourites were eliminated due to a plastic block. cyclingnews.com
29 – Bart Wellens, who broke his wrist during the World Championships after being hit by a plastic block, touched by a television motorcyclist demands 60,000 Euros for the matter as his season is over. telesport.nl

World championships

Elite

Under 23s

Juniors

World Cup

Superprestige

Gazet van Antwerpen

Other 2007 Cyclo-cross races

National Championships

 
Cyclo-cross by year